Elections to Banbridge District Council were held on 19 May 1993 on the same day as the other Northern Irish local government elections. The election used three district electoral areas to elect a total of 17 councillors.

Election results

Note: "Votes" are the first preference votes.

Districts summary

|- class="unsortable" align="centre"
!rowspan=2 align="left"|Ward
! % 
!Cllrs
! % 
!Cllrs
! %
!Cllrs
! %
!Cllrs
! % 
!Cllrs
!rowspan=2|TotalCllrs
|- class="unsortable" align="center"
!colspan=2 bgcolor="" | UUP
!colspan=2 bgcolor="" | SDLP
!colspan=2 bgcolor="" | DUP
!colspan=2 bgcolor="" | Alliance
!colspan=2 bgcolor="white"| Others
|-
|align="left"|Banbridge Town
|bgcolor="40BFF5"|62.9
|bgcolor="40BFF5"|4
|24.1
|1
|7.2
|0
|5.8
|1
|0.0
|0
|6
|-
|align="left"|Dromore
|bgcolor="40BFF5"|63.5
|bgcolor="40BFF5"|3
|19.0
|1
|17.5
|1
|0.0
|0
|0.0
|0
|5
|-
|align="left"|Knockiveagh
|bgcolor="40BFF5"|49.0
|bgcolor="40BFF5"|3
|24.4
|1
|15.2
|1
|0.0
|0
|11.4
|1
|6
|- class="unsortable" class="sortbottom" style="background:#C9C9C9"
|align="left"| Total
|57.6
|10
|22.7
|3
|13.5
|2
|1.8
|1
|4.4
|1
|17
|-
|}

Districts results

Banbridge Town

1989: 3 x UUP, 1 x SDLP, 1 x DUP
1993: 4 x UUP, 1 x SDLP, 1 x Alliance
1989-1993 Change: UUP and Alliance gain from DUP and due to the addition of one seat

Dromore

1989: 4 x UUP, 1 x SDLP
1993: 3 x UUP, 1 x SDLP, 1 x DUP
1989-1993 Change: DUP gain from UUP

Knockiveagh

1989: 2 x UUP, 1 x DUP, 1 x SDLP, 1 x Independent Nationalist
1993: 3 x UUP, 1 x DUP, 1 x SDLP, 1 x Independent Nationalist
1989-1993 Change: UUP gain due to the addition of one seat

References

Banbridge District Council elections
Banbridge